Mary Portas (née Newton; born 28 May 1960) is an English retail consultant and broadcaster, known for her retail- and business-related television shows, founding her creative agency Portas and her appointment by David Cameron, the British Prime Minister, to lead a review into the future of Britain's high streets.

Early life and education
Portas was the fourth child of five siblings, born into a Catholic and Protestant Irish family in a small end-of-terrace in Windsor Road in north Watford. She attended Holy Rood Catholic Junior School (in north Watford) and then St Joan of Arc, a Catholic grammar School in Rickmansworth. Her Belfast born Catholic mother, died of encephalitis when Portas was aged 16, her father soon remarried but died of a heart attack two years later forcing Portas, aged 18, to turn down a place at the Royal Academy of Dramatic Art in order to look after her younger brother on her own.

Career
Portas started her career in retail with a Saturday job in John Lewis. She then had a part-time, and later a full-time, job with Harrods where she was responsible for window displays for about three years, before joining Topshop as display manager. While in this job, she was spotted by Burton Group chairman Sir Ralph Halpern.

Her next role brought Portas her first taste of fame and public acclaim, as creative director of Harvey Nichols. Portas is credited with turning Harvey Nichols into a leading modern fashion brand. She created the groundbreaking Harvey Nichols window displays that became part of the guided tours of London — one of her most famous displays was "Autumn Intrusion" - a commission by artist Thomas Heatherwick that won a D&AD Gold award in 1997. She then persuaded the store's owners to use younger designers, and gained publicity in the BBC's Absolutely Fabulous series in the 1990s, after promising writer and star of the show Jennifer Saunders the run of the store for research in return for Saunders namechecking the business. By the age of 30, Portas was a member of the company's board.

In 1997 Portas left Harvey Nichols to launch an agency, Yellowdoor, producing campaigns for clients including Clarks, Louis Vuitton, Oasis Stores, Swarovski, Dunhill, Boden, Thomas Pink, Patek Philippe and Mercedes-Benz, Sainsbury's, Habitat, Westfield, Liberty and The Body Shop . In January 2013 she re-launched her agency as Portas Agency Ltd. Today, Portas Agency advises retail clients from every continent, and the businesses success is built on an obsessive understanding of human and cultural behaviour.

Portas is claimed to be one of the UK's foremost authorities on retail and brand communication. She regularly travels around the world advising on retail strategy and frequently lectures on the theme of brands and retail. Notably, Portas spoke alongside Neil Armstrong at the Cannes Palais Festivals in October 2007, and spoke at the Yorkshire International Business Convention with the Dalai Lama in June 2012.

Notable career milestones
Before the age of 30, Portas became a member of the board at Harvey Nichols.

In 1997, Portas left Harvey Nichols to launch her consultancy business, Yellowdoor. When asked in a Radio Times interview why she left Harvey Nichols, Portas is quoted to have said "I wanted to create my own world. I wanted freedom."

Portas's first television appearance was as a guest on Richard & Judy in 2005, where she was spotted by television producer Patricia Llewellyn who then signed Portas to production company Optomen Television.

On 19 June 2009, in a ceremony at Galashiels, Heriot-Watt University awarded Portas a Doctorate of Letters in recognition of her career and her contribution to the advancement of marketing and brand communications within the retail sector

In December 2009, Portas opened her first permanent 'Living & Giving Shop' in support of charity Save the Children. There are now 26 shops open across London and Edinburgh. She was also named as the charity's Global Retail Ambassador. To date, the charity shops have raised in excess of £23m for Save The Children. Portas has been credited with revolutionising the charity shop store format, making "Mary's Living & Giving" a destination for second hand and pre-loved clothing and separating it from the rest of the category - "Charity shops with a difference".

In 2011, Portas moved from BBC to Channel 4. Her first series for the channel was Mary Portas: Secret Shopper which aired in January 2011.

In August 2011, Portas opened her own shop, called "Mary & House of Fraser" within UK department store House of Fraser's Oxford Street flagship. The store stocks her first fashion collection, called 'Mary Portas', as well as other product collaborations including a footwear collection with Clark's - "Mary & Clark's", and a hosiery collection with Charnos - "Mary & Charnos". Portas also launched a new product, 'Armery', which is a hosiery-type garment for the arms. The product is designed to "banish bingo wings".

Books
Portas' first book, Windows – the Art of Retail Display, was published in five languages by Thames & Hudson.

Her second book, How to Shop with Mary, Queen of Shops, was published by BBC Books in 2007 to accompany the television series. The book was co-authored by Peter Cross, Josh Sims and Melanie Rickey.

Her third book, Mary Portas, Shop Girl, a memoir, was published by Doubleday in 2015.

Her fourth book, Work Like A Woman, was published in 2019 by Penguin.

Her fifth book, Rebuild, was published in July 2021.

Journalism
Since 2005, Portas has written a weekly column Shop!, for the Daily Telegraph magazine, reviewing shops across the country. She started writing the column in 2005 and it was her critiquing of shops that was the inspiration for the BBC documentary and accompanying book. Each week, Portas reviews shops based on their location, shopability, service and website - awarding retailers marks out of 10.

Between 2008 and 2010, Portas wrote a weekly column for consumer fashion magazine Grazia, offering career advice and mentoring.

Television career
Portas' programmes are shown in over 20 international territories, including on Australia's Lifestyle Channel.

Other television appearances
Portas presented an episode of The Money Programme called Mary Portas: Save Our Shops in 2009.

She appeared in the Panorama documentary "On the Rack" which exposed unethical production practices by fast fashion retailer Primark; and has appeared as a panellist on The Apprentice: You're Fired! four times.

In March 2011, Portas regularly appeared in the Channel 4 series Lily Allen: From Riches to Rags, in which she advised the pop star on her venture into fashion retail.

In October 2018 she appeared on series 12, episode 2 of Would I Lie To You.

Mary's Living and Giving Shops

Following the BBC Two series Mary, Queen of Charity Shops in June 2009, Portas was appointed as Global Retail Ambassador for Save the Children. She developed the "Living & Giving" concept as a new type of charity shop that puts the local community at its heart - "not just a shop, but a place to inspire, share, create, meet and discover". The first Living & Giving shop Portas opened was a three-week-long pop up at Westfield London, earning the charity over £190,000. Portas has gone on to open seven permanent Living & Giving shops, in Edinburgh, Westbourne Grove, Primrose Hill, Parson's Green, Barnes, New Kings Road and Chiswick.

Portas Pilot towns
On 4 February 2012, the minister for local government, Grant Shapps, announced that towns across England could bid to become Portas Pilot Areas. A total of twelve towns were to receive a share of £1m, as well as the support of the Minister, Whitehall and Mary Portas. In May 2012, the twelve towns to be helped were announced as: Bedford, Croydon, Dartford, Bedminster (Greater Bristol), Liskeard, Margate, Market Rasen, Nelson, Newbiggin-by-the-Sea, Stockport, Stockton-on-Tees and Wolverhampton.

In July 2012, fifteen more towns were announced as: Ashford, Berwick, Braintree, Brighton (London Road), Hatfield, Royal Leamington Spa (Old town), Liverpool (Lodge Lane), Waterloo, Forest Hill, Tower Hamlets (Chrisp Street, Watney Market and Roman Road), Loughborough, Lowestoft, Morecambe, Rotherham and Tiverton.

Retail venture
In August 2011, she opened her first retail shop as a concession in House of Fraser's Oxford Street branch. The shop, named Mary & House of Fraser, sells clothing and lifestyle products aimed at the 40+ female market, and was filmed for a Channel 4 documentary Mary Queen of Frocks that aired in October 2011.

Personal life
Portas was married to chemical engineer and Unilever executive Graham Portas for 14 years; they had two children. Portas later lived with Melanie Rickey in Primrose Hill with her children and their son after a divorce from her husband.

On 29 March 2014, Portas attended the "I Do To Equal Marriage" event, which celebrated the introduction of same-sex marriage in England and Wales.
At one minute past midnight on 10 December 2014, Portas and Rickey became one of the first couples in the UK to convert their civil partnership to a marriage, following a parliamentary change to the Marriage Act. The pair announced their separation on 17 May 2019. Portas started a new relationship in 2022 and prefers to keep the details private.

She spends her money on art, wine, theatre and chocolate, and enjoys gardening. She was named as one of the top 100 Tweeters in the UK by The Independent in 2011.

Government appointment
In May 2011, she was appointed by the Prime Minister David Cameron and Deputy Prime Minister Nick Clegg to lead an independent review into the future of the high street.  She published her report "The Portas Review" on 13 December 2011.  
Portas states the aim of her review to "put the heart back into the centre of our High Streets, re-imagined as destinations for socialising, culture, health, wellbeing, creativity and learning". The review goes on to detail 28 specific recommendations and on 13 December, the Prime Minister David Cameron issued a statement thanking Portas for her review and explaining that the Government would respond to her recommendations in spring 2012. Cameron said "I am delighted that Mary Portas has produced such a clear vision of how we can create vibrant and diverse town centres and breathe life back into our high streets."

A 2017 retrospective article by The Telegraph showed Portas' plan failed to stem the number of High Street store closures.

References

External links
 Portas' website
 

1960 births
Living people
Bisexual women
British bisexual writers
English businesspeople in fashion
English businesspeople in retailing
English journalists
English non-fiction writers
English television presenters
British LGBT broadcasters
British LGBT businesspeople
British LGBT journalists
People from Rickmansworth